1911 is a year in the Gregorian calendar.

1911 may also refer to:

Aircraft
 Bristol 1911 Monoplane
 Epps 1911 Monoplane

Comets
 1911 IV (C/1911 S3), discovered by Sergei Ivanovich Beljawsky
 1911 V (C/1911 O1), discovered by William Robert Brooks

Firearms
 M1911, a semi-automatic pistol
 Remington 1911 R1, modeled after the M1911
 Ruger SR1911, modeled after the M1911
 Winchester Model 1911, a semi-automatic shotgun

Mass media
 1911 (film)
 1911 Encyclopædia Britannica